BMC Switzerland AG (abbreviation of "Bicycle Manufacturing Company") is a Swiss bicycle and cycling product manufacturer based in Grenchen.  BMC designs, builds and distributes road bikes, mountain bikes, and commuter bikes primarily for sale to dealers in North America, Europe, South Africa, Australia, East Asia and the United Arab Emirates.

History

1986-2001 founding and early years
In 1986, American Bob Bigelow founded BMC as an assembler and wholesale distributor of Raleigh bicycles (then owned by Derby Cycle). After losing his distributor's license, Bigelow began building bikes under a new BMC label, but it remained a niche brand. In 2001, the company shifted their strategy, turning to greater investment in engineering and design.

2001 - present

BMC's relationship to performance cycling began when BMC began supplying the Swiss professional road racing team Phonak with bikes. The team's patron was Andy Rihs, owner of the world-leading hearing-aid company of the same name. Andy Rihs took over BMC in 2000 with the vision of building a carbon production facility in Grenchen, Switzerland to produce the ‘Porsche of race bikes’ and the Impec road bike was created. Having a carbon production facility at its disposal has heavily influenced how BMC approaches bike manufacturing. The facility is now called the Impec Advanced R&D Lab, and it is primarily used for research and development by the company's design and engineering teams.

Professional cycling teams and athletes riding BMC's bikes have won the Tour de France, the Tour de Romandie,  the Tirreno–Adriatico, the Tour de Wallonie,  the Paris–Tours, Critérium International, Paris–Roubaix, and many other high-profile events. In 2014 and 2015 the BMC Racing Team won the UCI Team Time Trial World Championships. In 2015, Australian rider Rohan Dennis broke the hour record on a BMC.

Sponsorship

At the end of the 2018 season, BMC withdrew support of the BMC Racing Team, whose former leader, Cadel Evans won the 2011 Tour de France, the BMC Mountain Bike Racing Team as well as the BMC Factory Trailcrew. From 2019, BMC is a bicycle supplier for Team Dimension Data. Beside that, BMC is also co-sponsoring the Uplace-BMC Pro Triathlon Team as well as many other athletes.

References

External links

 

Cycle manufacturers of Switzerland
Cycle parts manufacturers
Mountain bike manufacturers
Swiss brands
Vehicle manufacturing companies established in 1986
Swiss companies established in 1986
Manufacturing companies of Switzerland
Companies based in the canton of Solothurn
Grenchen